Chrysotus longipalpus is a species of fly in the family Dolichopodidae. It is distributed worldwide, though it is an introduced species in much of its range. It is associated with greenhouses.

References

Insects described in 1896
Diaphorinae
Cosmopolitan arthropods
Taxa named by John Merton Aldrich
Diptera of North America
Fauna of Saint Vincent and the Grenadines